A. pinnatifidum may refer to:
Aethephyllum pinnatifidum, a succulent plant of South Africa
Aralidium pinnatifidum, a tree of southeast Asia
Argyranthemum pinnatifidum, a flowering plant of Madeira
Asplenium pinnatifidum, a fern of the eastern United States
Athroisma pinnatifidum, a plant of Madagascar